The Pere Marquette State Forest encompasses lands in Michigan’s northern Lower Peninsula, on the western side of the state.  Counties within the Pere Marquette are: Leelanau, Benzie, Grand Traverse, Kalkaska, Manistee, Wexford, Missaukee, Mason, Lake, Osceola, Oceana, Newaygo and Mecosta.

The trails are well suited to biking, hiking and cross country skiing.

It is named after French explorer Jacques Marquette, who founded the first European settlement of Michigan in 1668.

External links
 Cadillac Pathway Map

Michigan state forests
Protected areas of Leelanau County, Michigan
Protected areas of Benzie County, Michigan
Protected areas of Grand Traverse County, Michigan
Protected areas of Kalkaska County, Michigan
Protected areas of Manistee County, Michigan
Protected areas of Wexford County, Michigan
Protected areas of Missaukee County, Michigan
Protected areas of Mason County, Michigan
Protected areas of Lake County, Michigan
Protected areas of Osceola County, Michigan
Protected areas of Oceana County, Michigan
Protected areas of Newaygo County, Michigan
Protected areas of Mecosta County, Michigan